The Lee and Gottliebe Fritz House, located at 132 North Oak in Gordon, Nebraska, is a historic house that was built in 1909.  It was listed on the National Register of Historic Places (NRHP) in 2003.  The listing included a garage, older than the house itself, as another contributing building.

In its NRHP nomination, it was deemed significant as "a distinctive example of a significant type of construction in Gordon, Nebraska, namely ... a Dutch Colonial Revival residence."  It was noted that Dutch Colonial Revival is "extremely rare...in this part of Nebraska."  In fact it is apparently the only example in Sheridan County.  And also it was also deemed significant for association with Lee Fritz, "a leading Sheridan County citizen".

References

External links 
More photos of the Lee and Gottliebe Fritz House at Wikimedia Commons

Houses on the National Register of Historic Places in Nebraska
Dutch Colonial Revival architecture in the United States
Houses completed in 1909
Houses in Sheridan County, Nebraska
National Register of Historic Places in Sheridan County, Nebraska